Jaipur Lok Sabha constituency is one of the 25 Lok Sabha (parliamentary) constituencies in the Indian state of Rajasthan.

Assembly segments
Presently, Jaipur Lok Sabha constituency comprises eight Vidhan Sabha (legislative assembly) segments. These are:

Members of Parliament

Election results

2019 results

2014 results

2009 results

2004 results

1999 results

1998 results

1996 results

1991 results

1989 results

1984 results

1980 results

1977 results

1971 results

1967 results

1962 results

1957 results

1952 results

See also
 Jaipur district
 List of Constituencies of the Lok Sabha

References

External links
Jaipur lok sabha  constituency election 2019 result details

Jaipur
Lok Sabha constituencies in Rajasthan